The Women's combined competition of the Beijing 2022 Olympics was held on 17 February, on "Rock" (DH) and "Ice River" (SL) courses at the Yanqing National Alpine Ski Centre in Yanqing District.

The defending champion was Michelle Gisin. The silver medalist, Mikaela Shiffrin, as well as the bronze medalist, Wendy Holdener, qualified as well. Gisin retained her title finishing ahead of Swiss compatriot Wendy Holdener with Italy’s Federica Brignone winning bronze. Shiffrin was the 2021 world champion, with Petra Vlhová and Gisin being the silver and bronze medalists, respectively. Shiffrin did not finish the slalom run.

Schedule

Qualification

Results
Results are as follows:

References

Women's alpine skiing at the 2022 Winter Olympics